The title Break It On Down and variants can apply to multiple different hip-hop songs:

".357 – Break It On Down" (also known as just "Break It On Down"), a track from LL Cool J's 1987 release Bigger and Deffer
"Break It On Down", a track from 2 Live Crew's 1989 release As Nasty As They Wanna Be
"Break It On Down", a track from 95 South's 1995 release One Mo' 'Gen
"Break It On Down (Battlezone)" (also known as just "Break It On Down"), a track by Flii Stylz & Tenashus in 2005's Rize

See also
"Break It"
Break It All Down
Break It Down (disambiguation)
Bring It (disambiguation)